The Desulfocapsaceae are a family of Thermodesulfobacteriota.

Phylogeny
The currently accepted taxonomy is based on the List of Prokaryotic names with Standing in Nomenclature (LPSN) and National Center for Biotechnology Information (NCBI)

See also 
 List of bacterial orders
 List of bacteria genera

References 

Desulfobacterales
Bacteria families